Watermelon Creek is a stream in the U.S. state of Georgia. It is a tributary to the Altamaha River.

Watermelon Creek was named for the watermelon crop in the area.

References

Rivers of Georgia (U.S. state)
Rivers of Tattnall County, Georgia